Wisent is a flavoured vodka produced by Polmos Łańcut in Poland which features bison grass. It contains 40% alcohol by volume.

See also 
 Żubrówka

External links 
 Polmos Łańcut

Polish vodkas